Digital Rapids Corporation is a privately held technology company headquartered in Markham, Ontario, Canada that produces hardware and software for the digital media industry. Founded in 2001, Digital Rapids develops systems and software for media ingest, multi-screen video encoding, transcoding, streaming, and workflow automation. Media and entertainment companies using Digital Rapids products include Deluxe, Foxtel, the Miami Heat NBA team, NBC Universal, Starz and Turner Broadcasting. A variety of customers in education, government, corporate and worship markets also use Digital Rapids products.

On April 7, 2014, Digital Rapids was acquired by Imagine Communications.

Products

StreamZ & StreamZHD
StreamZ & StreamZHD are standard-definition and high-definition ingest and encoding systems supporting video ingest from live and pre-recorded sources, and real-time output in multiple formats to live streams or archive files.

Transcode Manager
Transcode Manager is enterprise-class software that automates the process of transforming large volumes of digital media files from one format to another.

StreamZ Live
StreamZ Live is a video encoding system for live-to-live applications, such as streaming live events or programs to IPTV, and mobile platforms.

Broadcast Manager
Broadcast Manager is enterprise-class software that controls and automates the multiple output streams of Digital Rapids encoders.

TouchStream
TouchStream is a portable streaming encoder for live video sources with a 7-inch touch-interface display.

Kayak
Kayak is a workflow management system and automation platform and the underlying technology platform for recent versions of other Digital Rapids products.

Flux
Flux is a series of PCI-Express video capture and pre-processing cards that can be integrated into Windows computers.

Awards

Streaming Media magazine, Readersí Choice Awards (2009, 2010, 2011, 2012)
CSI magazine, CSI Awards (2010 ìBest Web TV Technology or Serviceî, 2012 ìBest Workflow/Asset management/Automation Solutionî)
Deluxe Outstanding Technical Achievement Award, 2012
TV Technology Europe magazine, Superior Technology (STAR) Awards (2008, 2009, 2010, 2011)
TVBEurope magazine, ìBest of IBC Editorís Awardî (2008, 2009, 2011) 
INTERNET TELEPHONY magazine, Product of the Year Award, 2010 
Frost & Sullivan Market Share Leadership Award and Hot Company Watchlist, 2009, ìBroadband Transcoding Marketî
IBC Innovation Award, 2008
Broadcast Engineering magazine Pick Hit Award, 2008
Frost & Sullivan Customer Value Enhancement and Entrepreneurial Company of the Year Awards, 2008, ìWorld Video Encoders and Transcoders Marketî
PROFIT Magazine, PROFIT 100 Canadaís Fastest-Growing Companies, 2007

See also
  AVCHD
  H.264/MPEG-4
  VC-1
  adaptive bitrate streaming
  transcoding
  video codec
  content delivery network
  streaming media

References

External links
 Digital Rapids Corporation's official website

Software companies of Canada
Companies established in 2001
Software companies established in 2001
Companies based in Markham, Ontario